A disaster medical assistance team (DMAT) is a group of professional  medical personnel organized to provide rapid-response medical care or casualty decontamination during a terrorist attack, natural disaster, or other incident in the United States.

DMATs are part of the National Disaster Medical System and operate under the Department of Health and Human Services (DHHS). DMATs were founded under the US Public Health Service, operating under FEMA. Post 9/11, U.S. Department of Homeland Security assumed responsibility of DMATs.

Organization
There are 80 NDMS Teams of which 55 are DMATs spread out across the country, formed of local groups of health care providers and support personnel. Under the National Response Framework (NRF), DMATs are defined according to their level of capability and experience. Once a level of training and proficiency has been shown, a higher level of priority is given the team.

In addition to medical DMATs, there are other response teams that specialize in specific types of medical emergencies such as hazardous material handling and decontamination and LRATs, which are primarily logistical response teams to support any of the response teams under the NDMS umbrella. Such other types of teams are TCCT (Tactical and Critical Care Response Team), DMORT (Disaster Mortuary Operations Response Team), NVRT (National Veterinary Medical Response Team), LRAT (Logistics Response Team), IMT (Incident Management Team) and VIP (Victim Identification Personnel Team).

A DMAT deploys to disaster sites with the assurance by ASPR that supplies and equipment will arrive at or before the teams arrive at a disaster site, so that they can be self-sufficient for 72 hours while providing medical care at a fixed or temporary site. Responsibilities may include triaging patients, providing high-quality medical care in adverse and austere environments, and preparing patients for evacuation. Other situations may involve providing primary medical care or augmenting overloaded local health care facilities and staffs. DMATs have been used to implement mass inoculations and other immediate needs to large populations. Under rare circumstances, disaster victims may be evacuated to a different locale to receive medical care. DMATs may be activated to support patient reception and distribution of patients to hospitals.

Team composition and equipment
DMATs are composed of physicians, nurse practitioners, physician assistants,nurses, paramedics, pharmacists and pharmacy technicians, respiratory therapists, mental health specialists, and a variety of other allied health and logistical personnel. DMATs typically have 85 members, from which the team leader chooses up to 35 members to deploy on missions requiring a full team.  Smaller strike teams or other modular units [Health and Medical Task Forces, or HMTFs] can also be rostered and deployed when less than full-scale deployments are needed.

DMAT members are termed "intermittent" federal employees and once activated by federal order, their status changes to one of an active federal employee, following the GS pay scale. Federally-activated DMAT members are protected from tort liability while in operation and are also protected by the provisions of the Uniformed Services Employment and Reemployment Rights Act (USERRA) which affords the same protections extended to deployed National Guard and active-duty military in that their full-time jobs are not placed in jeopardy. This protection came in 2003 after an act of Congress.

DMATs formerly traveled equipped with medical equipment and supplies, large tents, generators, and other support equipment (cache) necessary to establish a base of operations: designed to be self-sufficient for up to 72 hours in a disaster area and treating up to 250 patients per day. However, during the period 2009–2011, ASPR changed the operational tactics and removed team caches to a small number of federal warehouses to save money; thus teams no longer had the opportunity to practice and train with their own caches.  The capability is similar to an urgent-care health facility. In 2005, FEMA increased the response capabilities of DMATs by issuing trucks to teams who obtained a certain standard of training and capabilities. But they, too, were reclaimed by ASPR and are only available during actual deployments to deliver the caches from the federal warehouses.

Incidents
The first ever DMAT deployment occurred in 1989, when the New Mexico DMAT (NM-1) responded to the US Virgin Islands following Hurricane Hugo. The next DMAT deployments were in 1992, for Hurricane Iniki, to the island of Kauai, and a short time later to Florida for Hurricane Andrew. In 1994, teams responded for the 6.7 Magnitude Northridge Earthquake, in southern California, augmenting hospitals that were overwhelmed, and providing medical care at areas where people made homeless congregated.  NDMS DMATs have been called to respond to a variety of other incidents, many of which garnered significant media attention. Teams responded to the World Trade Center site and the Pentagon following the 9/11 terrorist attacks. Some DMAT personnel were used to assist in the collection of remains for identification by DMORTs at Ground Zero. Three DMATs responded when the city of Grand Forks had to be almost completely evacuated when the Red River of the North flooded the city in the spring of 1997, providing mass care at a large shelter for over 10,000 evacuees at the Grand Forks Air Force Base.

DMATs are a critical element of the federal response to natural disasters including Hurricane Katrina. During Katrina DMAT teams treated and helped evacuate patients in and around New Orleans, including people at the Louisiana Superdome and Louis Armstrong New Orleans International Airport.

Twelve DMATs participated in the international response to the 2010 Haiti earthquake and cared for more than 31,300 patients, including 167 surgeries and the delivery of 45 infants.

More recently, DMATs have aided in the response to Hurricane Sandy, which was particularly devastating to areas of New York and New Jersey. Following Hurricane Harvey, DMATs provided shelter care as well as acute care in field locations in,  around and south of Houston, TX. A prolonged response for Hurricanes Irma and Maria took place in Florida, Puerto Rico and the US Virgin Islands in 2017 by multiple full teams and smaller task forces of DMAT personnel. Additional deployments by specialized aeromedical evacuation personnel from DMATs assisted in the evacuation of  State Dept employees from Wuhan China,  US citizens from a cruise ship quarantined in Japan, and aboard the Grand Princess Cruise Ship at sea to identify the most ill passengers that needed to be evacuated soonest from the ship when it arrived in port. Currently, in October 2022, ongoing deployments are occurring in response to Hurricane Ian in the hardest hit areas of southwestern Florida.

References

External links
 
 
 
 http://www.oh-1dmat.org

Disaster preparedness in the United States
Federal Emergency Management Agency
Disaster medicine